St George's Boy School was an all-boys boarding school in Ramsgate, Kent, England, in the 19th century right through till the mid-1970s, when it then joined St George's Girls C of E School at the current Broadstairs campus to form St Georges C of E Foundation School.

History

The St George's Family 
Of what is known there were actually three St George's Schools in the 19th century that were all part of the same family, two of these were girl-only schools and the other was a boy boarding school, the two old schools (St George's Girls C of E School and St George's Boys School) were very close schools, both located in Ramsgate and the third was St George's Girls School, which was located at the current Broadstairs site, and the two old schools then joined them over time to form the current school as we know it.

Defunct schools in Kent
Educational institutions disestablished in 1975
1975 disestablishments in England